Cottageville may refer to:
Cottageville, New Jersey
Cottageville, South Carolina
Cottageville, West Virginia